Southern Head is a headland located at the southwestern tip of Grand Manan Island in the Canadian province of New Brunswick.

Southern Head is an important landmark:

 It forms the southern and westernmost point on Grand Manan Island.
 It forms the northwestern limit of the Bay of Fundy and is opposite the southwestern limit at Brier Island, Nova Scotia.

The Canadian Coast Guard maintains an automated light station to assist vessels navigating in the thick fog that frequents the area, particularly during the humid summer months.

Headlands of New Brunswick
Landforms of Charlotte County, New Brunswick